Lynette Wagg (born 5 June 1939) is an Australian sprint canoer who competed in the mid-1960s. At the 1964 Summer Olympics, she finished ninth in the K-2 500 m event.

References

Sports-reference.com profile

1939 births
Australian female canoeists
Canoeists at the 1964 Summer Olympics
Living people
Olympic canoeists of Australia